Zdenka Predná (31 March 1984) is a Slovak female singer. She is one of the most successful finalists of the Slovak version of the Pop Idol, called Slovensko hľadá Superstar for season 2004–2005. Zdenka Predná has recorded two studio albums.

Zdenka's vocals also featured on the popular trance track, You, by Robert Burian, which was released in 2010.

Discography

 2005 - Sunny Day
 2007 - Zdenka Predná
 2009 - Srdce z bubliny

See also
 The 100 Greatest Slovak Albums of All Time

References

1984 births
Living people
21st-century Slovak women singers
People from Banská Štiavnica